Adrien Demuth (born 14 April 1991) is a French chess grandmaster.

Chess career
Born in 1991, Demuth earned his international master title in 2011 and his grandmaster title in 2015. He is the No. 14 ranked French player as of March 2018.

References

External links

1991 births
Living people
Chess grandmasters
French chess players
Sportspeople from Saint-Denis, Réunion
20th-century French people
21st-century French people